Henry Torrens Anstruther (27 November 1860 – 5 April 1926) was a Scottish Liberal Unionist politician.

Biography 
The second son of Sir Robert Anstruther, 5th Baronet MP, he was educated at Eton College and the University of Edinburgh. He became an advocate in Edinburgh in 1884, and was Liberal Unionist Member of Parliament for St Andrews Burghs from 1886–1903 in succession to his father. He served in government as a Lord of the Treasury from 1895–1903.

He was a Justice of the Peace for Buckinghamshire and Fife, and from 1903 was a member of the Administrative Council of the Suez Canal Company. He was an Alderman on London County Council from 1905–1910. With his wife, the writer Eva Anstruther, whom he divorced in 1915, he was father of the writer Joyce Anstruther, better-known via her pen-name of Jan Struther.

References

Sources

Image, npg.org.uk. Accessed 22 November 2022.

External links 
 

1860 births
1926 deaths
Members of London County Council
Members of the Parliament of the United Kingdom for Fife constituencies
Liberal Unionist Party MPs for Scottish constituencies
People educated at Eton College
UK MPs 1886–1892
UK MPs 1892–1895
UK MPs 1895–1900
UK MPs 1900–1906
Younger sons of baronets
19th-century Scottish politicians
20th-century Scottish politicians
Henry Torrens